Our Lady of Mount Carmel High School, was a private, Roman Catholic high school in Wyandotte, Michigan to the parish of Our Lady of Mount Carmel. It was closed in June, 2011 by the Archdiocese of Detroit.

History
In September, 1928, Rev. Father Peter Kruszka, Pastor of Our Lady of Mount Carmel Parish, the Felician Sisters from Livonia, Michigan, and zealous parishioners finally realized a long cherished dream and brought into existence the Our Lady of Mount Carmel High School, housed in a newly built two-story annex on what was then Electric Street.

The rapid growth of the school in number and advancement in educational standards was due to the unselfish and hard work of the succeeding pastors, especially Rev. Father Ladislaus Krych. Also, to the principals who had carried most of the burden of educating and directing: Sister Mary Simplicia, the pioneer in 1928; Sister Mary Bernadette, excellent teacher and acting principal for the initial years 1928 – 1931; Sister Mary Emmanuel, ardent character builder, crusader for athletics and higher education 1931 – 1935, 1939; Sister Mary Bonifilia, activity-conscious 1935 – 1937, Sister Mary Cantia 1937 – 1940 who promoted the growth of the school; Sister Mary Emmanuel, 1940 – 1946, under whose efficient principalship the school reached its highest standards: improvements in the curriculum to meet the needs of the students and in the school's facilities, installments and additions to aid the teachers in their schoolwork, which was possible through the cooperation and understanding of the pastor-professor, Fr. Krych.

A school's reputation is measured by definite standards, mainly by the recognized educational agencies. Our Lady of Mt. Carmel High School passed its tests successfully and since 1933 it had been accredited by various associations, namely, the University of Michigan, the Catholic University of America, and then later, MNSSA (Michigan Non-Public School Accrediting Association). Our Lady of Mt. Carmel High School had all of the licenses, approbations, and accreditations by the State of Michigan authorities which placed it among some of the best schools in the nation.

The school closed in 2011 due to a decline in enrollment.

In the 1940s, Father Krych himself sponsored ten annual scholarships to the high school. Students from Our Lady of Mt. Carmel, St. John Cantius (Delray), St. Stanislaus Kostka (Wyandotte), and St. Helena (Wyandotte) benefited from these by competitive examinations held in their own schools. Father Krych had also sponsored a $600 scholarship to Madonna College in Livonia. Also, an anonymous benefactor from New Boston, Michigan also sponsored many scholarships to the high school and elementary school specifically for students from New Boston.

The early enrollment at Our Lady of Mt. Carmel High School showed a steady upward rise. In 1928, the opening school year numbered 26 children; first year of the full high school in 1932 was 127 children. The curriculum began in 1928 with required subjects only,  and as the enrollment increased it was extended to include general and vocational subjects; ethics, science, mathematics, languages, commercial sciences, social studies, home economics, drafting, music, and gym. During World War II, relevant courses came in aeronautics, occupations, first aid, nutrition, and home nursing. Increase in courses entitled a need of a larger teaching staff. Among the majority of a lay staff, the Felician Sisters of Livonia faithfully served the children of Our Lady of Mt. Carmel until its close in 2011.

"Class A School"

The school facilities, in its day, placed Our Lady of Mt. Carmel High School in Class A category: the library had thousands of volumes of fiction and non-fiction, twelve sets of encyclopedias, many subscriptions to magazines, the laboratory was completely equipped for physics and chemistry, the music studio had an excellent supply of school instruments for band and orchestra, and an excellent drama department. In addition to the school's intellectual pursuits Our Lady of Mt. Carmel offered extracurricular activities in the form of clubs. Teachers, artists and many other vocational fields had the opportunity to express themselves in club activities. Those with acting talents performed in dramas throughout Mount Carmel's history. In 1945, Mount Carmel produced its first operetta “Hats Off.” Other operetta's included: “Don Alonso’s Treasure” (1947), An Old Kentucky Garden” (1949), and “Student Prince” was presented in 1948 in honor of Fr. Krych on the occasion of his 25th – year Silver Jubilee of ordination to the priesthood. Also, the Drama department portrayed the drama “Conquered” in honor of the Parish's Golden Jubilee in 1949. In the late-1940s, visual aids included a movie projector, film strip, recording machine, and a phonograph.

In 1943, school publications started with the schoolpaper, “The Carmont”, and in 1948 the first yearbook was published, “The Carmion”. Many editors, staff and moderators have strived to incorporate the high ideals of good journalism.  In 1971, another hardcover yearbook was published entitled Terminus.

Aside of its intellectual pursuits, the school offered an extracurricular religious program in addition to its regular ethics classes: annual retreats, the Junior Unit Holy Name Society for boys reorganized by Father Krych at the beginning of his pastorate at Our Lady of Mt. Carmel to foster spiritual growth and more frequent reception of the sacraments, the St. Casimir Society (altar boys),  St. Theresa's Sodality for girls, and school membership in the CSMC Unit as a part of a Catholic Action program dating back to 1929.

Sports and other Activities

Early Beginnings

Fr. Kruszka and Fr. Krych were the outstanding spiritual advisers and athletic directors in the history of the school. The latter especially had endeared himself to the students by his charity, fatherly care, and by his founding and fostering of an extensive athletic program: Baseball (1942), Basketball (1936); Rowing (1944); Football (1945); and girls Basketball (1944). Trophies from all sports dating back to the early 1940s are kept safe inside the school. The Ushers Club and the Friends of the Comets organizations had furnished funds for athletics and other needs of the school. The Oak Club, a non-parish organization, had been the financial purse for the athletic program at Our Lady of Mt. Carmel for many years.

Founding of The Oak Club

In the spring of 1945, Fr. Krych was toying with the idea of introducing football in the fall of the same year. He approached Thomas Watkowski with the idea of getting some men together to raise funds for football equipment. Six young men, Robert Bednarek, Alex Uszynski, John Jacobs, Henry Stec, Frank Wszelaki, and Thomas Watkowski formed a committee and sponsored a dance on September 22, 1945, netting a profit of $930 which was presented to the Athletic Fund of Our Lady of Mt. Carmel High School. Encouraged by their first success, the committee increased its membership by nine young men – Anthony Siemion, Peter Jablonski, Betram Lange, Leonard Kowaleski, Albert Hebda, Roman Watkowski, Walter Przytula, Steve Tar, and Len Stoh. They all laid plans to sponsor another success and $500 was donated toward the purchase of a rowing shell and $600 towards the purchase of instruments for the Mt. Carmel Band. Enthusiasm, close cooperation, and friendly relationships inspired the first fifteen men to form a club. Thus, the present Oak Club was founded on December 9, 1945, with the sole aim of furthering athletics through funds procured by means of various social activities. In 1949, the Oak Club was as generous as ever. The monthly dances, the dance of the year with Skitch Henderson at Wyandotte Chemicals, the annual picnic with the car raffle afforded funds enough to support the school's advertising program to pay for the transportation of the teams, the organization of the Mt. Carmel Legion team, all totaling to $1,250.

Boys' Basketball

In 1939, the Our Lady of Mt. Carmel Basketball Squad was renamed “The Comets”. Under Coach Szydlowski they finished two seasons. Later, Joe Piatek was named coach. He coached one championship team before enlisting in the Marines in 1942. Leaving before the title game with St. Josephat (Detroit), the former coach ended the season. Bob Bednarek took the leadership of the team during the seasons extending from 1942 – 1946. In these years he led them into two divisional and one district championship.

School Band

In 1940, Sister Mary Emmanuel initiated the first Our Lady of Mount Carmel band. Sister Mary Paulette directed the band along with Mr. E. Jensen as band instructor. Band awards were won by Our Lady of Mount Carmel for the first time in Wyandotte, July 4, 1948. Prizes consisted of : first place for best music, for best drum major, for best drilled band, and tied with Theoedore Roosevelt High School (Wyandotte) for best dressed band. Prizes amounted to $225.00. In 1968, Mount Carmel's marching band ceased to exist, but the orchestra lingered on until 1971. The school also had a glee club for several years.

Baseball

“The Comets” took to baseball in 1942 when they played in the city recreation league. They took top awards by downing all opposition. Although they made a fine showing, baseball was discontinued the following season. After a three-year lapse, in 1945, the Comets took to the diamonds and under Rev. Father Wyrzykowski won one of their four games. The next season found Joe Piatek at the helm of a team that captured the West Side title. On June 6 they met St. Florian (Hamtramck) at Briggs Stadium and almost turned in the greatest upset of the season when a seventh inning rally fell short of the mark. The final score read: St. Florian 3, Mt. Carmel 1. With this game they closed the season. In 1947, the Comets set out to retain their title, but, as the season got under way, it was evident that they lost the spark that sent them forth the previous year. After the final tally was taken, the Comets were found in second place.

Football

Football was introduced into Our Lady of Mt. Carmel High School in 1945. The initial game was played on Sunday, September 30. That year the Comets were under the supervision of Roman Watkowski and Captain Henry Lojewski. Although they won only one of seven grid battles, they showed great promise. During this season, the Knights of Columbus donated a victory trophy which went to the victor of the annual Mt. Carmel – St. Patrick game. In 1946, Fr. Krych named Joe Piatek as coach and Roman Watkowski as his assistant. The Comets finished their season tied for third place by winning 5 and losing 2. A majority of returning letter winners were on hand when the Comets began practice for their third season of league play under the direction of Coach Piatek. A month later, the first league game was played which ended in a scoreless tie with Sacred Heart (Dearborn). Following this contest, there were two victories before the Comets were dropped by St. Patrick for the third straight year in the battle for the Knights of Columbus trophy.  A layoff of one week followed, allowing time for the hurt Comets to lick their wounds. The remaining opposition seemed to be no match for Mt. Carmel as they rolled over all opponents finishing the season with possession of second place.

Rowing

In 1944, with a borrowed four shell and the hope of establishing a new era in Our Lady of Mt. Carmel's Athletic program, a trailblazing crew began practice with no established coach. This four doubled in 1945. That year the crew was coached by Ed Kalisiewicz, who was to become coach for three more years. Although no outstanding meets were won, that eight was the first Catholic High School Crew in the State of Michigan. In 1946, the first victory came on June 8. Later, they became Midwest Champions by winning four out of seven races. On May 24, 1947, Our Lady of Mt. Carmel entered a four in the National Scholastic Rowing Regatta held in Wyandotte and by winning that, they became the National Schoolboy Champs.

References

External links
 

Roman Catholic Archdiocese of Detroit
Defunct Catholic secondary schools in Michigan
Schools in Wayne County, Michigan
Educational institutions established in 1928
Educational institutions disestablished in 2011
Polish-American culture in Metro Detroit
1928 establishments in Michigan
Wyandotte, Michigan
2011 disestablishments in Michigan